A transferable skill is an ability or expertise which may be used in a variety of roles or occupations. Examples include communication, problem-solving and self-control.

A Confederation of British Industry report of 2014 identified 18 transferable competencies applicable to science, technology, engineering and mathematics (STEM), leading the list with critical thinking, analysis and data collection.

See also
 Transferable skills analysis

References

Skills